The 7 veld was a later Dutch designation of the Krupp 7.5 cm Model 1903 field gun.

Purchase 
In 1905 the Dutch government purchased an early variant of the Krupp 7.5 cm Model 1903. The Dutch purchased 204 guns and 408 caissons from Krupp and produced another 120 guns under license.  These saw service both in The Netherlands and the Dutch East Indies.

Modernization 
During the 1920s, the Dutch studied the lessons learned from the First World War which highlighted improvements needed to keep the 7 veld up to date in the years before the Second World War. The primary improvements needed were increased elevation and longer range.  The prohibition on weapons production imposed by the Versailles Treaty lead German armament firms to open foreign subsidiaries to conduct business.  One of these was Siderius a Dutch subsidiary of Krupp, dedicated primarily to the modernization of Krupp artillery in service with the Dutch Army during the 1920s and 1930s.  The most effective of its projects was the Siderius Model 02/04.

Gander and Chamberlain claim there were three almost identical versions, the M 02/04, OM 04 and NM 10, but this has not been confirmed.  At least 16 were modified for motorized traction, presumably with steel wheels and pneumatic tires, for service with the Light Division.  The Germans designated guns they captured after the Battle of the Netherlands as the 7.5 cm Feldkanone 243(h).  These guns were issued to German occupation units during World War II.

Photo Gallery

Notes

References 
Hogg, Ian Twentieth-Century Artillery. New York: Barnes & Nobles, 2000 
 Gander, Terry and Chamberlain, Peter. Weapons of the Third Reich: An Encyclopedic Survey of All Small Arms, Artillery and Special Weapons of the German Land Forces 1939-1945. New York: Doubleday, 1979

External links 
 Dutch guns on War over Holland

Artillery of the Netherlands
Field artillery
World War II artillery